Esan South East Local Government Area is a local government area of Edo State, Nigeria. Its headquarters are in the town of Ubiaja.
 
Its population was 167,721 at the 2006 census.

Towns 
Towns in the jurisdiction are Ubiaja, Oria, Onog-Holo, Okhu-Esan, Udo, Feku, Illushi, Emu, Eguare-Ewatto, Ewohimi, Okhodua, Orowa, Uroh and Inyenlen.

Villages 
Many villages are found there:
 Agenebode, Agiere, Anumeji, Avhiodor,  Bode-Waterside,  Dapapa,  Edegbe, Egori-Nauge,  Egori-Waterside, Ekwotso,   Emnokweme, Ighawo, Igienebamhe,  Igiode, Ikwakpe, Ilogodo, Itogbo, Itsokwi,  Ivbiare, Ivbiebua, Ivhianokpodi, Ivhioghe, Iviakpekha,  Iviebua-Naameh, Iviegbepwi, Iviekpe, Iviogheme,  Iviokpo Iviomhe, Iviukhua, Iviukwe, Izotha, Oba Dudu, Obadudu, Ofukpo, Ogwoyo, Ogwozima, Ogwukpakpa, Okanawua, Okieh, Okiolomi, Oshola, Otaukwi, Othame, Ovao, Ugbato, Ughoke, Ukho, Ukpeko, Ukpeko-Agbugwi, Uzanu, Weppa-Wanno.
   Ega, Eguare-Oria, Ifade, Igo, Isoko Camp, Itoya Camp, John Smike Camp, Ogbokpa, Okoyoyomon Camp, Okudu, Omuakun,     Oria, Thomas Camp,  Ukpowada,           
   Eguare-Onogholo,  Ibo Camp, Idi Abora, Idi Akhanmlogie, Idi Okhae, Idi Osogbo,  Onogholo          
 Braimoh Camp, Eguare-Okhuessan,  Idehuana, Idiobo, Ikeken, Ikiala, Okhuessan, Eguare-Ohordua, .
   Eguare-Udo, Eko-Okukpon, Eko-Ugbodu, Eko-Utomhin, Idumhuan-Khinmhin, Udo,  Udo-Neria.
   Adagwu,  Ajakpa , Ajularo,  Alla, Ifeku, Iyegbe, Okpatawo, Okuoshimili, Owoli, Ukpodo.           
 Ega, Ilushi, Odumu Camp, Ofuloko, Okowede, Opuru      
 Akhiomen, Auma, Eguale, Eke, Eko Ojemohin, Emu, Emu Ibhiadu, Emu Norkhua, Emu Orankhuan, Emu Usolo, Emua, Idi-Oise, Obodigbon, Obodogun, Obolo, Odogbe,                 Okede, Okpogho, Udor,  Uneme, Ibhiadan, oboh.     
   Aburu,  Eguare-Ewatto, Ewatto-Ogbe, Ide Ima, Ide Negbon, Idi Agbor, Idi Eka, Idi Ije, Idi Iyasele, Idi Uromi, Idikve, Idumu Iselu Ogbokpa
    Asaboro, Ewohimi, Idi Arebun, Idi Ebun, Idi Elo,  Idi Ojomo, Idi-Orio, Idumagbo, Idumagbor,  Idumije, Idumisaba, Idumobo, Idumuguokha, Ikhekhe, Ikomu, Iselu, Odoghu, Ogbe, Oghu, Okaigbn, Okede, Olenokhua, Omhen, Uboko, Uhaekpen, Uzebu, Uzoguo.

References

Local Government Areas in Edo State